Lewis Hill (May 1, 1919 – August 1, 1957) was a co-founder of KPFA, the first listener-supported radio station in the United States, and the Pacifica Radio network.

He was born in Kansas City, Kansas, on May 1, 1919. His father was an attorney who made his fortune by brokering a deal to sell an oil company to J.P. Morgan. His mother's brother was Frank Phillips, builder of Phillips Petroleum. Lewis was sent to Wentworth Military Academy in Lexington, Missouri, because he was too bright for the public school. According to his widow, he "despised" his time at military school, but he completed his first two years of college there and also was the Missouri State doubles tennis champion. He then transferred to Stanford University.

While studying at Stanford in 1937, his interest in Quakerism led him to a belief in pacifism. As a conscientious objector, Hill served in Civilian Public Service during World War II. In 1945, Hill resigned from his job as a Washington, D.C., correspondent and moved to Berkeley, California.

In 1949 he established KPFA. To support the station financially, he founded the Pacifica Foundation. He served as Pacifica's head until his suicide (during a period of failing health from spinal arthritis) in 1957.

References

External links
PACIFICA FOUNDATION VINDICATED ON LABOR ISSUES AT KPFA
The Lengthening Shadow: Lewis Hill and the Origins of Listener-Sponsored Radio in America
MY KPFA: A Historical Footnote John Whiting documents Pacifica Radio's early years, with almost a hundred hours of programs and interviews.

1919 births
1957 deaths
People from Kansas City, Kansas
Wentworth Military Academy and College alumni
Stanford University alumni
American conscientious objectors
American radio company founders
Pacifica Foundation people
Suicides in California
American radio executives
Members of the Civilian Public Service
20th-century American businesspeople
1957 suicides